Tristaniopsis laurina, the water gum or kanooka, is a tree species native to Australia. It usually grows near the eastern coastline and along the banks of streams, where the trunks and branches tend to be shaped in the direction of the current and give an indication of the flood height.

Description
The tree is multi-branched, and may be pruned to maintain a compact shape.

The flowers are bright yellow and have a distinctive and, to some, unpleasant odour. They attract honeybees as well as small native species of bee. They usually bloom in the late spring or early summer.

Cultivation
Tristaniopsis laurina is cultivated as an ornamental tree by plant nurseries, for use in gardens and civic landscaping. It is popular because it is easy to grow and is a good shade tree. Many are planted as street trees, especially in Sydney.

See also
Tristaniopsis collina, hill water gum
Syzygium francisii, giant water gum
Syzygium crebrinerve, black water gum

References

External links

laurina
Myrtales of Australia
Trees of Australia
Flora of New South Wales
Flora of Victoria (Australia)
Flora of Queensland
Garden plants of Australia
Ornamental trees